The Italian Jazz Awards (acronym IJA) are an independent musical review created in 2006 by Andrea Causi and managed by the ACM (Italian free management Agency) in collaboration with the American Management Agency. The purpose of the IJA is to reward the best Italian jazz musicians, chosen by an Artistic Board and voted on by the audience on the IJA Official Website. The awards are dedicated to the memory of the Italian jazz pianist Luca Flores, who died in 1995.

Andrea Causi created the awards while a student of the Jazz Graduation Course of the Conservatory of music G. F. Ghedini in Cuneo. The first edition of the IJA started in 2007 along the lines of the American Jazz Awards.

The awards consist of four categories with four nominees chosen by an Artistic Board. The Board changes every two years, and is formed of jazz musicians and journalists, tasked with picking four finalists, who then pass to the final phase of the contest: the public polls.

The only one of the awards not voted on by the audience but chosen by the Artistic Board is the Honorary Award, assigned to the most important Italian jazz musician of Europe and the world.

In February 2008, American jazz pianist Uri Caine was the special guest of the IJA'07 red carpet show.

Winners

2007 Genoa
Honorary Award: Luca Flores (posthumous assigned to Flores' sister Barbara)
Best Jazz Act: Dado Moroni
Best Jazz Singer: Danila Satragno

2008 - Sanremo/Rome/Milan
Honorary Award: Renato Sellani
Best Jazz Act: Fabrizio Bosso
Best Jazz Singer: Larry Franco
Brand New Jazz Act: Paolo Alderighi
Best Jazz Album: It's a Good Day - Patti Wicks Trio
P-Choice Award: Blue Dolls

Artistic Board: Freddy Colt, Maria Grazia Scarzella, Melania Renzi, Samuel J. Morris.

2009 - Alessandria/Bari
Honorary Award: Franco Cerri
Best Jazz Act: Giovanni Amato
Best Jazz Singer: Paola Arnesano
Brand New Jazz Act: Francesco Negro
Best Jazz Album: "Lifetime" - Daniele Scannapieco

Artistic Board: Tiziana Ghiglioni, Patti Wicks, Freddy Colt, Paolo Longo, Adriana Isoardi, Renzo Coniglio, Massimo Epinot.

2010 - Mola di Bari/Locorotondo/Bernalda
Honorary Award: Jula de Palma
Best Jazz Act: Mirko Signorile
Best Jazz Singer: Giuseppe Delre
Brand New Jazz Act: Attilio Troiano

Artistic Board: Barbara Flores, Guido Di Leone, Freddy Colt, Paolo Longo, Adriana Isoardi, Massimo Epinot.

2011 - Rome/Udine 
Honorary Award: Franco D'Andrea
Best Jazz Act: Mauro Zazzarini
Best Jazz Singer: Cinzia Spata
Brand New Jazz Act: Barbara Errico

Artistic Board: Barbara Flores, Guido Di Leone, Eva Simontacchi, Stefano Maurizi, Roberto Chiriaco.

Notes 

Jazz festivals in Italy
Italian music awards
Awards established in 2006
Music festivals established in 2006
2006 establishments in Italy